The Jackson First United Methodist Church is a historic church at 1022 College Ave. in Jackson, Kentucky. It was built in 1922.  It was added to the National Register of Historic Places in 1986 as M.E. Church, South.

It is a United Methodist church.

It has a two-story Classical Revival sanctuary with a monumental portico. It was built of brick to replace the congregation's previous building, which had been destroyed by fire.

References 

United Methodist churches in Kentucky
Churches on the National Register of Historic Places in Kentucky
Neoclassical architecture in Kentucky
Churches completed in 1922
20th-century Methodist church buildings in the United States
National Register of Historic Places in Breathitt County, Kentucky
Neoclassical church buildings in the United States
1922 establishments in Kentucky